Admiral Donnelly may refer to:

John J. Donnelly (born 1952), U.S. Navy vice admiral
Michael P. Donnelly (admiral) (born 1967), U.S. Navy rear admiral
Ross Donnelly (1764–1840), British Royal Navy admiral